Kinder's Mill is a historic building in Deemston, Pennsylvania.

It is designated as a historic residential landmark/farmstead by the Washington County History & Landmarks Foundation.

References

External links
[ National Register nomination form]

Grinding mills on the National Register of Historic Places in Pennsylvania
Industrial buildings completed in 1782
Buildings and structures in Washington County, Pennsylvania
Grinding mills in Pennsylvania
National Register of Historic Places in Washington County, Pennsylvania
1782 establishments in Pennsylvania